The old Newton Abbot Hospital was a health facility in East Street, Newton Abbot, Devon, England. It was managed by Torbay and Southern Devon Health and Care NHS Trust. The main entrance block is a Grade II listed building.

History
The facility, which was designed by Sir George Gilbert Scott and William Bonython Moffatt, opened as the Newton Abbot Union Workhouse in 1837. A new infirmary building, designed by Samuel Segar, was added in 1871. An inquiry by the Local Government Board in 1894 found that some elderly patients were placed naked into sacks known as "jumpers" and that this treatment had led to the death of at least one such patient. It became the Newton Abbot Public Assistance Institution in 1930 and joined the National Health Service in 1948. After services transferred to Newton Abbot Community Hospital in 2009, the old Newton Abbot Hospital closed and the main building was subsequently converted into a Sainsbury's outlet.

References

Hospitals in Devon
Hospitals established in 1837
1837 establishments in England
Hospital buildings completed in 1837
Defunct hospitals in England
Newton Abbot